Patrick Auracher (born January 4, 1990) is a German footballer who plays for TSV Essingen.

References

External links

Patrick Auracher at FuPa

1990 births
Living people
Stuttgarter Kickers II players
Stuttgarter Kickers players
Holstein Kiel players
Wormatia Worms players
3. Liga players
Regionalliga players
German footballers
Association football defenders
Footballers from Stuttgart